Resident Evil (Biohazard in Japan) is a Japanese multimedia horror franchise owned by the video game company Capcom. The franchise was created in 1996 with Resident Evil, a survival horror video game developed and published by Capcom for the PlayStation console. The game's critical and commercial success drove Capcom to continue developing the series. Due to Resident Evil's extended success, Capcom licensed more media based on the franchise including live action and animated films, novels, and comics.

Video games

Major releases

Original

Remakes

Revelations

Spin-offs

Console

Mobile phone

Pachinko

Film and television

Live action films

Animated films

Television series

Novels

Written by S. D. Perry

Novelizations of the live action films

Other novels

Comics

Stage plays

References

External links

 
 

Resident Evil
Resident Evil
Resident Evil